Kundalahalli is an eastern suburb of Bengaluru city in Karnataka state of India.

Connectivity 
A six-lane railway overbridge near Marathahalli Junction connects Kundalahalli area and HAL Airport Road. Kundalahalli junction (aka Kundalahalli Gate), is a gate way to Tech corridor. The route is important for commuters between the city and Whitefield and is known for congested traffic. The road is partially closed from the underpass construction at Kundalahalli Gate and may cause traffic disruptions while a subway project is being completed.

References

External links

Neighbourhoods in Bangalore